Linda Arsenio (born June 20, 1978) is an American actress and model from Texas. She has predominantly appeared in Indian films in various languages. She is probably best known for her performance as Jessica Beckham in the 2006 Hindi film Kabul Express.

Early life
Arsenio was born on Galveston Island, Texas, the daughter of a Salvadoran mother and a Yugoslavian father.  She has two sisters and one brother, who live in Texas.

She studied at the Actors' Conservatory in Dallas for two years, graduating with a degree in acting and continued her studies in acting in New York City.  Having already experience with theatre and musicals, she went on to do professional theatre in Texas and later in New York, which then led her to working in feature films.

Career
She made her acting début in an English independent film, called The Process of Creative Deception, before stepping into the Hindi film industry. She has acted in Tamil and Telugu films.  The Tamil films are Sachein and Thotti Jaya in which she has item numbers, and she also plays a cameo in Kana Kandaen.  The Telugu movie she has acted in is Bhadra.  She has a forthcoming film called Twinkle Twinkle Little Star.

Her first Hindi film is Kabul Express. This movie was entirely shot in Afghanistan. She currently resides in Mumbai where she continues to be active in  Hindi after the success of Kabul Express. She also appeared in other movies Mumbai Salsa, and Aloo Chaat  with Aftab Shivdasani.

In early 2007, she had acted in two cross-cultural Tamil telefilms, titled My Dear Father (En Iniya Thanthai) and Self Defence (Aththu Meera Aasai), both directed by 'Atlanta' Ganesh.

In 2009, she acted in the Malayalam film Pazhassi Raja alongside popular South Indian actors Mammootty and Sarath Kumar. However, she received much criticism for her role in the film (as Malabar District Sub-Collector's young wife Dora Baber).

Filmography

References

External links
 

Living people
1978 births
People from Galveston, Texas
Actresses from Texas
American film actresses
American people of Salvadoran descent
American people of Yugoslav descent
American expatriate actresses in India
Actresses in Hindi cinema
Actresses in Tamil cinema
Actresses in Telugu cinema
Actresses in Malayalam cinema
21st-century American actresses